In mathematics, the tanhc function is defined for  as
The tanhc function is the hyperbolic analogue of the tanc function.

Properties 
The first-order derivative is given by

The Taylor series expansionwhich leads to the series expansion of the integral as

The Padé approximant is

In terms of other special functions 
 , where  is Kummer's confluent hypergeometric function.
, where  is the biconfluent Heun function.
 , where  is a Whittaker function.

Gallery

See also
 Sinhc function
 Tanc function
 Coshc function

References

Special functions